Union Station is an intermodal transit station in Jackson, Mississippi, United States. It is operated by the Jackson Transit System and serves Amtrak's City of New Orleans rail line, Greyhound Lines intercity buses, and is Jackson's main city bus station.

History 
Train service first came to Jackson, Mississippi in 1840, when the Clinton and Vicksburg Railway established a connection. The city became a more prominent rail hub after the American Civil War as a stop for what eventually became the Illinois Central Railroad. The modern Georgian Revival station was built in 1927 by Illinois Central when the rail lines were rebuilt through downtown.

Passenger trains served in past 
This Illinois Central operated trains to these endpoints through the station:
Chicago and New Orleans (including City of New Orleans and the all-Pullman Panama Limited and others)
Chicago and Gulfport, Mississippi
Shreveport, Louisiana and Meridian, Mississippi (Southwestern Limited)

Revival 
After years of disuse, in 2003 the City of Jackson purchased the building from the Canadian National Railway, the successor to Illinois Central, with the intention of turning it into a multimodal hub named Union Station. The city undertook a $20 million renovation funded by the Intermodal Surface Transportation Efficiency Act and the Jackson Redevelopment Authority; Dale and Associates were chosen as architects. The city converted the building into the Jackson Transit System's primary bus station and added facilities for Greyhound Lines. The former freighthouse was converted for use by Amtrak, and other areas of the building were redesigned for commercial use. Dale and Associates received a 2005 Mississippi AIA Merit Award for the completed project. It is listed as a Mississippi Landmark.

References

External links 

Jackson Amtrak Station (USA Rail Guide -- Train Web)

Amtrak stations in Mississippi
Railway stations in the United States opened in 1927
Former Illinois Central Railroad stations
Jackson, Mississippi
Clock towers in Mississippi
Buildings and structures in Jackson, Mississippi